Vincent Breet (born 26 April 1993) is a South African competitive rower.

He competed at the 2016 Summer Olympics in Rio de Janeiro, in the men's coxless four. The South African team finished in 4th place.

References

1993 births
Living people
South African male rowers
Olympic rowers of South Africa
Rowers at the 2016 Summer Olympics
Harvard Crimson rowers
World Rowing Championships medalists for South Africa
21st-century South African people